Pilsbryspira jayana is a species of sea snail, a marine gastropod mollusk in the family Pseudomelatomidae, the turrids and allies.

Description
The length of the shell varies between 9 mm and 15 mm.

Distribution
This marine species occurs from Eastern Florida, USA to Panama; off Jamaica; and the Virgin Islands.

References

External links
 Adams, C. B. 1850. Description of supposed new species of marine shells which inhabit Jamaica. Contributions to Conchology, 4: 56-68, 109-123
 
 Gastropods.com: Pilsbryspira jayana

jayana
Gastropods described in 1850